Hellertown is a borough in Northampton County, Pennsylvania. Its population was 6,131 at the 2020 census. Hellertown is part of the Lehigh Valley metropolitan area, which had a population of 861,899 and was the 68th most populous metropolitan area in the U.S. as of 2020. The borough is home to Lost River Caverns, a natural limestone cavern.

Geography
Hellertown is located at  (40.584099, -75.338139).

Government and politics

Legislators
State Representative Robert L. Freeman, Democrat, 136th district
State Senator Lisa Boscola, Democrat, 18th district
US Representative Susan Wild, Democrat, 7th district

Transportation

Pennsylvania Route 412 runs north-south through Hellertown on Main Street, heading north to Bethlehem and south into Bucks County, where it provides access to Pennsylvania Route 611. PA 412 has an interchange with Interstate 78 just outside the corporate limits of Hellertown, which heads west to Allentown and Harrisburg and east to Easton and New York City.

LANTA provides bus service to Hellertown along Route 215, which provides service Monday-Saturday north to Bethlehem and Lehigh Valley International Airport, and Route 105, which provides Sunday service north to Bethlehem and the Lehigh Valley Mall. Klein Transportation and Trans-Bridge Lines provide bus service from Hellertown to New York City from a park and ride lot located at the interchange between I-78 and PA 412. Hellertown formerly had commuter rail service along SEPTA's Bethlehem Line north to Bethlehem and south to Philadelphia at Hellertown station, but service ended in 1981.

Demographics

As of the census of 2000, there were 5,606 people, 2,448 households, and 1,571 families residing in the borough. The population density was 4,180.8 people per square mile (1,615.3/km2). There were 2,570 housing units at an average density of 1,916.6 per square mile (740.5/km2). The racial makeup of the borough was 98.20% White, 0.30% African American, 0.07% Native American, 0.20% Asian, 0.68% from other races, and 0.55% from two or more races. Hispanic or Latino of any race were 2.48% of the population.

There were 2,448 households, out of which 24.7% had children under the age of 18 living with them, 51.2% were married couples living together, 10.3% had a female householder with no husband present, and 35.8% were non-families. 30.5% of all households were made up of individuals, and 17.2% had someone living alone who was 65 years of age or older. The average household size was 2.29 and the average family size was 2.85.

In the borough, the population was distributed, with 20.2% under the age of 18, 6.6% from 18 to 24, 29.0% from 25 to 44, 21.2% from 45 to 64, and 23.1% who were 65 years of age or older. The median age was 42 years. For every 100 females there were 89.3 males. For every 100 females age 18 and over, there were 86.2 males.

The median income for a household in the borough was $39,651, and the median income for a family was $49,604. Males had a median income of $37,935 versus $26,322 for females. The per capita income for the borough was $20,119. About 4.1% of families and 4.6% of the population were below the poverty line, including 6.5% of those under age 18 and 3.3% of those age 65 or over.

Public education
Hellertown Borough and Lower Saucon Township are served by the Saucon Valley School District.
Saucon Valley School District is made up of an elementary school, middle school, and Saucon Valley High School.

Notable people
 Carl Benjamin Boyer, historian
 Glenn Hetrick, special makeup effects artist and designer
 Eugene J. McGuinness, former Bishop of Oklahoma City-Tulsa
 Ted Poley, lead singer of rock band Danger Danger
 Allen Woodring, 1920 Summer Olympics gold medalist, 200 metres

In popular culture
Hellertown is mentioned in:
 Hellertown is mentioned in two Kurt Vonnegut's novels, Slaughterhouse-Five (published in 1969) and Breakfast of Champions (published in 1973).
 In the August 31, 2009, episode "Sin" on Solved on the Investigation Discovery network the murder of Hellertown resident Rhonda Smith, who was found dead in Trinity Lutheran Church in Springfield Township, Pennsylvania, is explored.

References

External links

Borough website
Community website
Hellertown Historical Society website
Our Town, Hellertown, WLVT video

1742 establishments in Pennsylvania
Boroughs in Northampton County, Pennsylvania
Boroughs in Pennsylvania
Populated places established in 1742